Fine Arts College is an independent college in Hampstead, London, founded in 1978 with an average intake of 200 students aged 13 – 19.

The College offers over 25 A-level subjects in the Arts, Humanities and Social Sciences and 15 subjects at GCSE. Students entering Year 9 follow a broad academic curriculum alongside creative subjects, art, music and drama.

Fine Arts also runs a one year Portfolio course to prepare students for degree courses at university and art school, both in the UK and internationally. Students following this course are free to experiment across the four arts courses offered.

The Principal is Candida Cave MA, CFA Oxon, the Head is Emmy Schwieters, and the Deputy Heads are Craig Winchcombe (Academic) and Becky Hayes (Pastoral)

History 
The College was founded in 1978 by artists Nicholas Cochrane and Candida Cave and was originally located in the YMCA on Tottenham Court Road and specialised in the teaching of Art & History of Art. In 1982, the College relocated to Belsize Park and expanded its curriculum to cover the 25 subjects it teaches today. In 1994, the GCSE department opened, followed by Year 9 entry in 2018.

In 2002 the College moved to Centre Studios, a converted Victorian dairy in Englands Lane, which remains its main site today.

In 2015 the College became part of the Dukes Education Group, a family of schools and colleges encouraging excellence, located throughout the UK.

Educational Philosophy 

The ethos of the College is one of respect and hard work. This informs the approach to teaching which fosters the talents and ambitions of students in preparation for higher education.  Academic and creative abilities are equally valued and encouraged. The college is academically non-selective and the enrolment procedure is based on an informal but rigorous interview when both the quality of the student and their determination to achieve is assessed. The suitability of subject choice is based on previous achievement and references from previous schools. Students are encouraged to play a positive part in college life and local community. The small size of FAC is particularly important in encouraging and supporting students individually – moving away from the ‘us and them’ teacher-pupil relationships of their younger years. Student’s progress is closely monitored with fortnightly reports and regular tracking and tests. However, FAC also encourages self-discipline and self-motivation: the informal nature of relationships between staff and students strengthens high expectations and a rigorous approach to work. Lessons challenge the students to engage in discussion and debate so that, far from being simply ‘taught’, students become inquiring critical thinkers and independent learners. FAC’s aim is to inspire a passion for learning that will last a lifetime and continue to enrich beyond formal exams. The College regularly receives positive feedback from parents and students, either through student and parent surveys or through individual cards and emails of thanks.

Buildings 
The College operates across three separate sites within about 200 yards of one another, located between Belsize Park, Chalk Farm and Swiss Cottage tube stations. The main site, Centre Studios, houses the academic departments and the Fine Art, Graphics, Music, Music Technology, Media, Textiles, Film Studies, and Drama studios. The two other sites consist of the Photography studios and Maths and Science departments in Lambolle Place.

Notable former pupils 
 Theo Adams, artist and director
 Alfie Allen, actor
 Brooklyn Beckham, model and photographer, son of David Beckham and Victoria Beckham
 Sara Berman & Aimee Berman, fashion designers
 Orlando Bloom, actor
 Helena Bonham Carter, actress
 Johnny Borrell, guitarist and singer
 JJ Feild, actor
 Kayvan Novak, actor and director
 Mel Raido, actor
 Coco Sumner, singer
 Amelia Warner, actress
 Liam Watson

References

External links 
 School website

1978 establishments in England
Art schools in London
Belsize Park
Educational institutions established in 1978
Private co-educational schools in London
Private schools in the London Borough of Camden
School of Visual Arts